Sugar Sand Park is a municipal park located in Boca Raton, Florida.  It was developed by the Greater Boca Raton Beach and Park District.  It is operated by the City of Boca Raton.  It has won several awards for excellence, such as "Best of the Best Parks" in 2007.

In 2017 the park was reopened after a major project to improve the park and make it accessible to people of all abilities. The playground is completely wheelchair accessible and several activity stations have been added for the benefit of children with physical and cognitive disabilities.

Outdoor facilities

Sugar Sand Park has picnic tables, an outdoor science themed water playground, a carousel, an open field, 6 baseball fields, 2 basketball courts and an inline hockey court.

Field House

The Field House is an indoor sport facility with 2 large indoor basketball courts.  It hosts several leagues, tournaments and special events.  It is also home to several classes and activities such as fencing and tae kwon do.  The Field House is open to public pick-up games of basketball and volleyball.

References

External links
 Sugar Sand Park

Buildings and structures in Boca Raton, Florida
Parks in Palm Beach County, Florida